This is a list of anarchist movements by region, both geographical and/or political.

Anarchism in Africa

Anarchism in Asia

Anarchism in Europe

Anarchism in North America

Anarchism in Oceania

Anarchism in South America

See also
List of anarchist communities

Movements By Region
Lists by region